John Francois DeMave is an American television actor. He is perhaps best known for playing Forest Ranger Bob Erickson in CBS's television series Lassie.

De Mave began his career in 1962, appearing in the television series Surfside 6. He guest-starred in television programs including F Troop, Marcus Welby, M.D., The Fugitive, The Mary Tyler Moore Show, Daniel Boone, Adam-12 and Wagon Train, and The Doris Day Show. In 1968, De Mave joined the cast of CBS's television series Lassie, playing the role of Forest Ranger Bob Erickson.

De Mave played the role of Dr. Gregory Eldridge in the soap opera television series Days of Our Lives and the role of Cal Clinton in The Bold and the Beautiful. His father was a professional boxer.

References

Bibliography

External links 

Rotten Tomatoes profile

Living people
Place of birth missing (living people)
Year of birth missing (living people)
American male television actors
American male soap opera actors
20th-century American male actors